Hasnul Zulkarnain Abdul Munaim (Jawi: حسن الذوالقرنين بن عبدالمنيم, born 16 July 1980) is a Malaysian politician. He has been Member of the Perak State Legislative Assembly for Titi Serong from 2018 to 2022.

Background 
Hasnul was born on 16 July 1980 in Kuala Kangsar, Perak, Malaysia. He had studied at the Sekolah Kebangsaan Sultan Idris 11; Sekolah Menengah Clifford, Kuala Kangsar and Sekolah Menengah Teknik Padang, Rengas before continuing his studies at the Politeknik Ungku Omar, Ipoh for Diploma in Civil Engineering. He married Nadila Sharif and the couple has five children. Before entering politics, he run his business of construction, a PROTON car service centre in Kuala Kangsar and Restoran La Parra in Ipoh.

Politics career
Hasnul was previously a member of Pan-Malaysian Islamic Party (PAS) before he joined National Trust Party (AMANAH) of Pakatan Harapan (PH) coalition in 2015. He was elected Perak assemblyman after winning the Titi Serong state seat as AMANAH candidate in 2018 general election (GE14). He was later appointed the Member of the Perak State Executive Council (EXCO) for Communication, Multimedia, Non-governmental Organisations and Co-operatives Development until the collapse of the PH state government in 2020 Malaysian political crisis. In the aftermath, he quit AMANAH and turned to become independent aligned to the new ruling Perikatan Nasional (PN) coalition in March 2020. and later joined its component BERSATU in July 2020, However, on 23 March 2021 he was sack from BERSATU due to his actions in supporting Perak UMNO chairman Saarani Mohamad as Perak Menteri Besar.

Controversies and issues 
During Hasnul's five months of Perak Football Association (PAFA) presidency, he was criticised for his actions of showing off the Malaysia Cup trophy inappropriately amid the success of Perak team becoming the champion. He at last resigned as the President of PAFA ending his tenure from August to October 2018.

Election results

External links

References 

Living people
1980 births
People from Perak
Malaysian people of Malay descent
Malaysian Muslims
Malaysian businesspeople
Independent politicians in Malaysia
Malaysian United Indigenous Party politicians
National Trust Party (Malaysia) politicians
Malaysian Islamic Party politicians
Members of the Perak State Legislative Assembly
Perak state executive councillors
21st-century Malaysian politicians